Iker Begoña Zubiaur (born 15 November 1976) is a Spanish retired footballer who played as a central defender or a defensive midfielder.

Club career
Born in Bilbao, Basque Country, Begoña reached the Segunda División in late 2001 at already 25, signing with Recreativo de Huelva from lowly Alicante CF. He appeared in 21 games and scored one goal in his first season to help his team return to La Liga after an absence of 23 years, then remained a further four campaigns with the Andalusians, three of them in the second division; he made his debut in his country's top flight on 1 September 2002, playing the full 90 minutes in a 2–3 home loss against Málaga CF.

Subsequently, Begoña continued competing in the second tier, with Lorca Deportiva CF and Albacete Balompié. In November 2009, the 33-year-old moved abroad for the first time in his career, signing with Levadiakos F.C. in the Super League Greece. He split the 2011–12 campaign in the same country with that club and Thrasyvoulos F.C. of division two, retiring at its closure.

Personal life
Begoña's older brother, Ibon, was also a footballer and a defender.

References

External links

1976 births
Living people
Spanish footballers
Footballers from Bilbao
Association football defenders
Association football midfielders
Association football utility players
La Liga players
Segunda División players
Segunda División B players
Tercera División players
CD Basconia footballers
Bilbao Athletic footballers
Athletic Bilbao footballers
Gernika Club footballers
Bermeo FT footballers
Amurrio Club footballers
Alicante CF footballers
Recreativo de Huelva players
Lorca Deportiva CF footballers
Albacete Balompié players
Super League Greece players
Football League (Greece) players
Levadiakos F.C. players
Thrasyvoulos F.C. players
Spanish expatriate footballers
Expatriate footballers in Greece
Spanish expatriate sportspeople in Greece